Bridal Veil Falls Provincial Park is a BC Park located on the Trans-Canada Highway just east of Rosedale, British Columbia, Canada, part of the City of Chilliwack. The community of Bridal Falls is located adjacent to the falls and park as well as the interchange between the Trans-Canada and BC Highway 9 and has a variety of highway-based tourism services. Access to the falls requires a short hike from the parking lot and well groomed trails, taking most groups 15-25 minutes.

This Park is named after the waterfall that it encompasses, the 38th highest waterfall in British Columbia, Bridal Veil Falls, however it is commonly stated incorrectly as the 4th tallest in Canada. The falls drop 122 metres (400 feet) over a wide rock face, creating a "veil-like" effect, however, only the bottom 200–250 feet can clearly be viewed from the base, due to the viewing-points' location directly at the base. It is located at the south end of the land set aside as provincial Park. Its source is from Mount Archibald and flows into Bridal Creek where it travels to Cheam Lake Wetlands Regional Park and finally to the Fraser River.

During drier summer months, the volume of the water decreases significantly, reducing the visual effect of the waterfall.

Bridal Veil Falls tend to freeze during cold winters and creates a wall of ice which is often unstable. Because of this, the base of the falls becomes an extremely hazardous area and the park remains closed during the winter season. When the falls does freeze solid, it is a sought-after ice climb, but it is known by climbers for its difficulty and the infrequency of stable climbing conditions. 
   
Bridal Veil Falls was named in the 19th century by the village of Popkum. In the early 20th century, the village used the waterfall with a hydro-electric generator to power the chalet and heated swimming pool in the village. Only the concrete foundation of the generator can be found today.

See also
List of waterfalls

References

Bridal Veil Falls from the World Waterfall Database

External links

 Bridal Veil Falls hiking trail description

Provincial parks of British Columbia
Lower Mainland
Waterfalls of British Columbia
1965 establishments in British Columbia
Yale Division Yale Land District